Musbah bint Nasser (1884 – 15 March 1961) was the first queen consort of Jordan.

She was born in 1884 in Mecca, Ottoman Empire. She was the elder twin daughter of Amir Nasser Pasha and his wife Dilber Khanum, the younger being Huzaima.

In 1904, Musbah married Sayyid Abdullah bin al-Husayn later King Abdullah I of Jordan at Stinia Palace, İstinye, Istanbul, Ottoman Empire. She bore him a son and two daughters:
 Princess Haya (1907 – 1990). Married Abdul-Karim Ja'afar Zeid Dhaoui.
 King Talal I (26 February 1909 – 7 July 1972).
 Princess Munira (1915 – 1987). Never married.

Abdullah went on to take two more wives. He married Princess Suzdil Khanum in 1913 (daughter of 'Ali) and Nahda bint Uman in 1949 (a Sudanese lady), making Musbah his senior wife. On 25 May 1946, Abdullah was proclaimed King of Jordan and Musbah, as his first wife, became Queen of Jordan.

Queen Musbah died on 15 March 1961 in Irbid, Jordan.

Titles
 1884 – 1904: Miss Musbah bint Nasser
 1904 – 1 April 1921: Her Royal Highness Princess Musbah Al-Abdullah
 1 April 1921 – 25 May 1946: Her Highness Emira of Transjordan
 25 May 1946 – 20 July 1951: Her Majesty The Queen of Jordan
 20 July 1951 – 11 August 1952: Her Majesty The Queen Mother
 11 August 1952 – 15 March 1961: Her Majesty Queen Musbah

References 

1884 births
1961 deaths
People from Mecca
Jordanian twins
Jordanian royal consorts
Arab queens
20th-century Jordanian women
Queen mothers